The International Transport Forum (ITF) is an inter-governmental organisation within the OECD (Organisation for Economic Co-operation and Development) system. It is the only global body with a mandate for all modes of transport. It acts as a think tank for transport policy issues and organises the annual global summit of transport ministers. The ITF's motto is "Global dialogue for better transport".  Between 1953–2007, the organisation had existed for over fifty years as the European Conference of Ministers of Transport (ECMT;).  The organisation is responsible for creating several standards, including the Classification of European Inland Waterways.

Role
The organisation brings together 65 member countries with the aim to advance the global transport policy agenda, and ensure that it continues to contribute to sustainable development, prosperity, social inclusion and the protection of human life and well-being. It works to facilitate the exchange of information internationally and to improve the capacity for decision making in member countries. Most recent member states are Argentina, Israel and Morocco (which joined in 2015), Kazakhstan and the United Arab Emirates (which joined in 2017), Tunisia (which joined in 2019), Mongolia and Uzbekistan (which joined in 2020) and Colombia (joined in 2021).

In its think tank role, the organization provides policy makers and the global transport community with evidence-based insights on transport policy issues. Its work is underpinned by economic research, statistics collection and policy analysis carried out by its in-house Research Centre, often in collaboration with researchers from academia, business and government. The Research Centre's programme of work focuses on environmental sustainability, road safety, efficiency, logistics, traffic congestion and infrastructure, among other themes. The Research Centre is headed by Mr Stephen Perkins (United Kingdom)..

The ITF maintains the International Road Traffic and Accident Database (IRTAD), a comprehensive database of statistics related to road safety. IRTAD also acts as a permanent working group of the ITF.

The ITF member states would from 1978 grant the same parking concessions to people with disabilities as they offered their own nationals. ITF has adopted Resolution no. 97/4 on Reciprocal Recognition of Parking Badges for Persons with Mobility Handicaps, facilitating reciprocity when it comes to Disabled parking permits between its member states.

In 2013, the ITF set up a Corporate Partnership Board (CPB) as a mechanism for engaging with the private sector and bringing a business perspective to the policy discussions.

Member states

Annual Summit
Every year, the Annual Summit of the International Transport Forum brings together ministers from member countries and invited countries in Leipzig, Germany, to debate a specific, transport-related theme with leaders from industry, civil society and the research community. At their Annual Summit, transport ministers of ITF member countries adopt an official Ministerial Declaration on policies relating to the Summit theme. Past Summits have focused on:

 Climate Change (2008, Presidency Finland)
 Globalisation (2009, Presidency Turkey)
 Innovation (2010, Presidency Canada)
 Transport for Society (2011, Presidency Spain)
 Seamless Transport (2012, Presidency Japan)
 Funding Transport (2013, Presidency Norway)
 Changing World (2014, Presidency France)
 Transport, Trade and Tourism (2015, Presidency New Zealand)
 Green and Inclusive Transport (2016, Presidency Denmark) see Declaration by Ministers on Green and Inclusive Transport, 19 May 2016
 Governance of Transport (2017, Presidency Mexico)
 Transport Safety and Security (2018, Presidency Latvia)
 Transport Connectivity and Regional integration (2019, Presidency Korea)
 The 2020 Summit was postponed by one year due to Covid-19. 
 Transport Innovation for Sustainable Development: Reshaping mobility in the wake of Covid-19 (2021, Presidency Ireland, Virtual Summit)
 Transport for Inclusive Societies (2022, Presidency Morocco)

Governance
The International Transport Forum is administratively integrated into the OECD (Organisation for Economic Co-operation and Development), but is politically autonomous and has its own governance structure.

The ITF’s highest decision-making organ is the Council of Ministers of Transport (CMT). The CMT unites the Ministers of member countries with responsibility for transport at the Ministerial Session held during the Annual Summit in May of each year. The CMT is chaired by the Presidency country. The Presidency of ITF revolves annually among members, alternating between a European and a non-European country. The Presidency has a leading role in organising the Annual Summit taking place during its tenure. The Presidency is supported by two countries as the First and Second Vice-Presidency. The Vice-Presidency countries traditionally assume the Presidency in the following years.

The direction of the work of the ITF is steered by the Transport Management Board (TMB). The TMB consists of representatives of ITF member countries and meets at least twice per year. The TMB is chaired by the Presidency country. Task Forces formed from TMB members assists the Presidency in preparing the Annual Summits.

The Transport Research Committee (TRC) organizes and overseas longer-term research projects. The TRC consists of representatives of transport ministries (which are sometimes also the TMB representative) and in other instances of delegates from transport-related research agencies of ITF member countries.

The Road Transport Group is a subgroup of European TMB representatives that oversees the distribution of European road freight transport licences under the so-called Multilateral Quota system and monitors compliance with the rules of the Quota system.

The Secretariat is the executive organ of the ITF. It is based at the OECD's headquarters in Paris, France. The Secretariat is led by ITF Secretary-General Young Tae Kim (Korea). Kim was elected by the Council of Ministers of Transport of the International Transport Forum on 1 June 2017 and took office on 21 August 2017. He succeeded José Viegas (Portugal), who had led the ITF's Secretariat from 2012 to 2017. Kim took office on 21 August 2017. . The Secretariat consists of five units: Research and Policy Analysis (RPA), Institutional Relations and Summit (IRS), Statistics and Modelling (STM), Communications (COM), and the Central Management Unit (CMU). It has around 60 staff members.

History
The International Transport Forum was created by the "Declaration on the Development of the ECMT" ("Dublin Declaration") agreed by Minister of Transport on 31 May 2006 in Dublin, Ireland. The Dublin Declaration evolved the European Conference of Ministers of Transport (ECMT) into a global organisation, with associate member counties of the ECMT (Australia, Canada, Japan, Korea, Mexico, New Zealand, United States) accepting an invitation to become full members. A history page on the ITF website provides a timeline of the ECMT and ITF.

The European Conference of Ministers of Transport (ECMT;). was established by protocol on 17 October 1953 in Brussels, Belgium. The ECMT remains the legal core of today's International Transport Forum.

See also
Peak car

References

External links 
 International Transport Forum
 Organisation for Economic Co-operation and Development
 web based transportation management systems software for shippers

OECD
Organizations established in 1953
International transport organizations
Organizations based in Paris